Ženski košarkaški klub Partizan 1953 (English: Women's Basketball Club Partizan), commonly referred to as ŽKK Partizan 1953 or simply Partizan, is a women's professional basketball club based in Belgrade, Serbia. Since 2015, the club has been competing under the legal name Partizan 1953. It is part of the multi-sports club Partizan. They are currently competing in the Serbian First League. The club won seven national championships, five national cups and two Adriatic League. They play their home games at the Sports Hall "Ranko Žeravica".

History

Formation and early years (20th century)
The club was founded in 1953. Three times a champion Yugoslavia, in the seasons 1983–84, 1984–85 and 1985–86. Partizan were then lead Jelica Komnenović, Biljana Majstorović, Olivera Krivokapić, Stojna Vangelovska, Cvetana Dekleva, Dragana Simić, Merhunisa Omerović, Zorana Cvetković, Radmila Lekić, Dragana Boreli, Olgica Mašić, Sonja Krnjaja, Zorica Ivetić, Andreja Pukšić, Tanja Stevanović... Partizan is in this period and twice won the Cup in 1985 and 1986.

Marina Maljković's era (2009–2013)
After the dissolution of Yugoslavia did not have success until the 2009–10 when they became champions Serbia. The following 2010–11 was more successful because the players of Partizan won the double crown, winning the Championship and Cup.

In the season 2011–12 Partizan is the first time won the Adriatic League triumph in the final tournament of the Zenica. The club's was better in the final of the domestic Čelik score of 74:65 . At the end of the season, Partizan won again Championship which was a total of 6 Champion in the history of the club.

In the season 2012–13 Partizan were won by Cup after the final of the Lazarevac team won Radivoj Korać with 103:71. The most effective players were American Brooke Queenan with 23 points, Milica Dabović with 21 and Dajana Butulija with 19 points. Partizan is the Adriatic League completed no defeats, and defended trophy. After 20 wins from as many matches in the regular part of the league, the Final Four of the Novi Sad won in first the semi-finals Vojvodina to 94:72, and in the finals as well as the Cup was better than Radivoj Korać with 70:45. At the end of the season and seventh Champion's title by winning the final play-off Championship of Serbia over the team Radivoj Korać.

Turbulence and recovery (2013–2015)
During the summer of 2013 the club had major financial problems for which they were threatened to be extinguish club, but despite the club survive. As a result, coach Marina Maljković and almost the entire team left the club. In the next season the club came in from the rejuvenated squad. In the Cup Partizan lost in the final of the Radivoj Korać with result 90:64. In the championship of Serbia in the semi-finals lost to eternal rivals Red Star, and in the regional league in the quarterfinals lost to teams of Budućnost Volcano.

In the 2014-15 season the club substituted by with identical composition as the last season with the ambition to consolidate the club financially and as regards the sporting aspect to at least repeat the results of last season. In the regional league is Partizan finished at 5th place in Group A, in the championship Serbia lost to the team of Vojvodina in the semi-finals and in Cup he lost in the semifinals of the Radivoj Korać.

Partizan 1953 (2015–present)
During 2015, the club is in the senior competition gave up participating in all competitions, the club formally stayed to function to restore the debts he had. In the meantime, established a new club under the name Partizan 1953 in which have moved all players from the previous club. Club he started from Second league of Serbia as the lowest rank of competition in Serbia.

After season 2015–16, club is provided back to the first division, which is also provided participate in regional league in next season by giving up certain clubs from Serbia that are based on the results in the previous season to provide.

Arena

Ranko Žeravica Sports Hall

Ranko Žeravica Sports Hall is a multi-purpose indoor arena located in the New Belgrade municipality and it has a capacity of 5,000 seats.

Vizura Sports Center

Vizura Sports Center is a multi-purpose indoor arena located in the Zemun municipality and it has a capacity of 1,500 seats.

Supporters

The Grobari (Serbian Cyrillic: Гробари) are supporters of the Belgrade football club Partizan. They generally support all clubs within the Sports Association Partizan, especially football and basketball teams.

Honours

Domestic
National Championships – 7

First League of SFR Yugoslavia:
Winners (3): 1984, 1985, 1986
First League of Serbia:
Winners (4): 2010, 2011, 2012, 2013

National Cups – 5

Cup of SFR Yugoslavia:
Winners (2): 1985, 1986
Cup of Serbia:
Winners (3): 2011, 2013, 2018

International
International titles – 2
Adriatic League Women:
Winners (2): 2011–12, 2012–13

Current squad

Partizan management
As of 19 April 2017

Notable former players

Ljiljana Stanojević
Mirjana Mujbegović
Biljana Majstorović
Olivera Krivokapić
Zorana Cvetković
Dragana Boreli
Zorica Ivetić
Olgica Mašić
Radmila Lekić
Sonja Krnjaja
Dragana Marković
Tanja Stevanović
Jelica Komnenović
Stojna Vangelovska
Jelena Popović
Cvetana Dekleva
Andreja Pukšić
Dragana Simić
Merhunisa Omerović
Mirjana Prljević
Olja Petrović
Jasmina Milojković
Jelica Čanak
Tamara Ružić
Hajdana Radunović
Nataša Ivančević
Mina Maksimović
Katica Krivić
Branka Stojićević
Sanja Vesel
Tanja Vesel
Tanja Stokić
Dijana Bukovac
Mirjana Medić
Aleksandra Radulović
Jadranka Savić
Sanja Lancoš
Svetlana Stanić
Ivanka Matić
Tanja Turanjanin
Ljiljana Božičković
Slavica Ilić
Tamara Velanac
Gordana Tešić
Aleksandra Samardžić
Ilvana Zvizdić
Jelica Dabović
Aleksandra Kukulj
Dušanka Ćirković
Iva Roglić
Dina Šesnić
Jefimija Karakašević
Alicia Gladden
Jelena Špirić
Sanja Kovrlija
Suzana Milovanović
Jovana Milovanović
Ivana Drmanac
Andrijana Vasović
Jovana Vukoje
Ljiljana Tomašević
Jelena Dangubić
Jelena Maksimović
Biljana Stjepanović
Svetlana Petrović
Milena Krstajić
Bojana Vulić
Tijana Brdar
Jelena Radić
Mirjana Velisavljević
Milena Vukićević
Sheena Moore
Jasmine Stone
Latoya Williams
Maja Miljković
Nataša Bučevac
Dunja Prčić
Neda Đurić
Mirjana Beronja
Brooke Queenan
Milica Dabović
Dajana Butulija
Tamara Radočaj
Nevena Jovanović
Biljana Stanković
Saša Čađo
Ivona Jerković
Nataša Kovačević
Marija Prlja
Jelena Antić
Aleksandra Vujović
Jovana Karakašević
Jovana Popović
Irena Matović
Jovana Pašić
Jelena Vučetić
Ivona Bogoje
Jelena Ivezić
Bojana Janković
Lidija Vučković
Julijana Vojinović
Miljana Bojović

Notable former coaches

Borislav Ćorković
Dragoljub Pljakić
Vladislav Lučić
Ljiljana Stanojević
Dragomir Bukvić
Miroslav Kanjevac
Slađan Ivić
Dragan Vuković
Marina Maljković
Milan Dabović
Srđan Antić

See also 
 List of basketball clubs in Serbia by major honours won

References

External links
 Official page at facebook.com
 Profile on fibaeurope.com
 Profile on eurobasket.com
 Profile on srbijasport.net

 
Women's basketball teams in Serbia
Basketball teams in Belgrade
Women's basketball teams in Yugoslavia
Basketball teams established in 1953